Nudurupadu is a village in Guntur district of the Indian state of Andhra Pradesh. It is located in Phirangipuram mandal of Guntur revenue division.

Demographics 
The total population constitutes  males,  females and  children, in the age group of 0–6 years. The average literacy rate stands at 63.73% with 2,246 literates, lower than the national average of 73.00%.

Government and politics 

Nudurupadu gram panchayat is the local self-government of the village. It is divided into wards and each ward is represented by a ward member. The ward members are headed by a Sarpanch. The village forms a part of Andhra Pradesh Capital Region and is under the jurisdiction of APCRDA.

Education 

As per the school information report for the academic year 2018–19, the village has a total of 6 Zilla Parishad/Mandal Parishad schools.

Transport 
Nudurupadu railway station is administered under Guntur division of South Central Railway zone and located on located on the Vijayawada-Guntakal section.

See also 
Villages in Phirangipuram mandal

References 

Villages in Guntur district